Johan Cyrille Corneel Vande Lanotte (born 6 July 1955) is a Belgian politician. He is a member of the SP.A, and became its party president on 15 October 2005. He handed down his leadership positions after the SP.A lost in the 2007 general election. Between 1995 and 2014, he served more than 13 years as Deputy Prime Minister, the longest period for a Flemish socialist after WW II.  In his last term he served as the Minister of Economy, Consumer affairs and North Sea in the Di Rupo I Government. With the formation of a new Centre-Right federal government, which excluded his party, Johan Vande Lanotte returned to local politics in October 2014 in Ostend, where he took up his position as alderman for the economy and tourism at Ostend City Council. From August 2015 until the end of 2018 Vande Lanotte was the mayor of Ostend. During his political career he continued to work as a professor at the University of Ghent, specialized in Constitutional Law and Human Rights. Since 2019, he is a lawyer (senior legal advisor) in the law office  Van Steenbrugge in Gent. He was the initiator of the Turkey Tribunal held in Geneva in September 2021

Studies 
In 1978 he graduated magna cum laude in Political and Social Sciences, option: Sociology (Master's degree) from the University of Antwerp. In 1981 he added, again magna cum laude, a master in Law at the Vrije Universiteit Brussel.

He graduated as Doctor in Law at the Ghent University in 1986. The subject of his dissertation was decentralisation in the Belgian political context. It was awarded with the Prize of the Belgian Institute for Administrative Sciences.

During his doctorate, he studied at the Swiss Institute of Comparative Law (Lausanne) with the Von Calcken scholarship of the Council of Europe, at the Lille University (France), the Leiden University (Netherlands) and the Université de Sherbrooke in Quebec.

Curriculum

Professional
1978–1981: City of Ghent administration.
1982–1983: assistant at the department of Political and Social Sciences of the University of Antwerp.
1983–1987: assistant at the Law department of the Ghent University.
1986: apprentice lawyer in Ghent.
1987–1990: assistant auditor and auditor at the Council of State (Belgium)
since 1988: part-time professor public law at the Ghent University
1988–1991: part-time professor public law at the Ghent University, combined with a part-time professorship at the Vrije Universiteit Brussel.
since 1991: part-time professor public law at the Ghent University, combined 
2010–2012: president of the non-governmental organization Coastal & Marine Union (EUCC)

Political
1988–1991: Chief of cabinet of the Minister of the Interior
1991–1994: Member of Parliament
1994–1995: Minister of the Interior and of Civil Service Affairs
1995–1998: Deputy Prime Minister and Minister of the Interior
1998–1999: Member of Parliament
1999–2003: Deputy Prime Minister and Minister of Budget, Social Integration and Social Economy
2003–2005: Deputy Prime Minister and Minister of Budget and Public Enterprises
2005–2007: SP.a party president
2005–2007: Member of Parliament
Since 2006: Minister of State (honorary title)
2007–2011: Senator
2011–2014: Deputy Prime Minister and Minister of Economy, Consumer affairs and North Sea
2015–2018: mayor of Ostend
2018-present: Senior Legal Counsel- Lawyer

Notes

External links
 
 

1955 births
Living people
Politicians from Ostend
Members of the Belgian Federal Parliament
Socialistische Partij Anders politicians
Belgian socialists
Politicians from Ghent
Belgian Ministers of State
Vrije Universiteit Brussel alumni
University of Antwerp alumni
Ghent University alumni
Academic staff of Ghent University

21st-century Belgian politicians